The 2016 North Carolina gubernatorial election was held on November 8, 2016, concurrently with the 2016 U.S. presidential election, as well as elections to the United States Senate and elections to the United States House of Representatives and various state and local elections.

Primary elections were held March 15. Both major party candidates won their primaries by overwhelming margins. The Republican nominee, incumbent governor of North Carolina Pat McCrory was running for a second term in office. Roy Cooper, the incumbent Attorney General of the state and the second-longest-serving Attorney General in North Carolina history, was the Democratic nominee. Lon Cecil, a consultant and electrical engineer, was the Libertarian nominee. This race was expected to be among the most competitive in the country in the 2016 gubernatorial election cycle.

On election night, the race was too close to call, with Cooper leading by fewer than 5,000 votes out of more than 4.6 million cast. That lead eventually widened to 10,281 votes. Cooper claimed victory that night, with thousands of provisional ballots still yet to be counted, saying, "We have won this race." However, McCrory refused to concede, claiming that the race was still too close to call and the winner had not yet been determined. He cast doubt on the authenticity of 90,000 late-arriving votes from Durham County, which put Cooper in the lead. McCrory's campaign filed complaints alleging voter fraud in over 50 counties. Both campaigns anticipated a protracted legal battle over the results.

On November 22, 2016, McCrory formally requested a statewide recount; once all ballots are counted, North Carolina election law allows either candidate to request a recount if the margin is fewer than 10,000 votes. On November 30, 2016, the North Carolina State Board of Elections ordered a recount of certain votes in Durham County. The recount was slated to be completed on December 5, 2016. However, when early results made it apparent that the margin would not change, McCrory conceded the race to Cooper on the afternoon of December 5.

This was the first time since North Carolina governors became eligible for immediate reelection in 1976 that a sitting officeholder was defeated in their bid for a second term. It was also the only gubernatorial seat to flip from Republican to Democratic in 2016. With a margin of 0.22%, this election was additionally the closest race of the 2016 gubernatorial election cycle.

Republican primary

Candidates

Declared
 Robert Brawley, former state representative
 Pat McCrory, incumbent governor
 Charles Moss, preacher, former Randolph County Soil & Water Conservation Board member, Democratic state senate candidate in 2004, and candidate for governor in 2012

Declined
 Greg Brannon, physician, Tea Party activist and candidate for the U.S. Senate in 2014 (running for U.S. Senate)
 Dan Forest, Lieutenant Governor of North Carolina (running for re-election)

Polling

Results

Democratic primary

Candidates

Declared
 Roy Cooper, North Carolina Attorney General
 Kenneth Spaulding, former state representative and candidate for North Carolina's 2nd congressional district in 1984

Withdrawn
 James Protzman, businessman and former Chapel Hill town council member

Declined
 Janet Cowell, North Carolina State Treasurer (not seeking re-election or running for any other office)
 Anthony Foxx, United States Secretary of Transportation and former Mayor of Charlotte
 Kay Hagan, former U.S. Senator, and former State Senator
 Charles Meeker, former mayor of Raleigh (running for Labor Commissioner)
 Heath Shuler, former U.S. Representative
 Josh Stein, state senator and former deputy attorney general of North Carolina (running for Attorney General)

Polling

Results

Libertarian primary

Candidates

Declared
 Lon Cecil, retired engineer and nominee for NC-12 in 2010

Withdrawn
 Ken Fortenberry, newspaper publisher, author, journalist and Republican candidate for North Carolina's 10th congressional district in 2012

Declined
 Sean Haugh, pizza delivery man and nominee for the U.S. Senate in 2002 and 2014 (running for U.S. Senate)

Write-in candidates

Declared

 Daniel Orr, navy veteran

General election

Debates
Complete video of debate, October 11, 2016 - C-SPAN
Complete video of debate, October 18, 2016 - C-SPAN

Predictions

Polling
Aggregate polls

with Pat McCrory

with Phil Berger

with Dan Forest

Preliminary results and legal battle

Polls closed at 7:30 pm on election day. On election night, as votes were tallied, Cooper held an early lead, but was overtaken by McCrory around 9:30 pm, and McCrory held the lead for most of the evening. Shortly before midnight, McCrory held a 60,000 vote lead until a block of 90,000 votes from Durham County was added to the total, putting Cooper back in the lead by fewer than 5,000 votes out of 4,500,000 cast. Both candidates addressed supporters around 12:30 am; Cooper declared victory, while McCrory vowed the race was not over and that every vote needed to be counted.

Under North Carolina state law, absentee ballots postmarked on or before election day must be counted, and military and overseas ballots accepted through November 17 must also be counted. Additionally, election administrators "must decide the eligibility of more than 60,000 provisional ballots and the validity of thousands of challenged votes." This process, plus a protracted legal challenge from the McCrory campaign, was likely to leave the election result not formally decided for some time after election day.

McCrory's campaign said that it had "grave concerns over potential irregularities in Durham County." Republican Party of North Carolina Chairman Robin Hayes called Cooper's declaration of victory "rude and grossly premature." On November 10, 2016, both campaigns announced they had retained attorneys in anticipation of a protracted legal battle: Cooper hired lawyers from Washington-based firm Perkins Coie (including Marc Elias), while McCrory hired lawyers from Virginia-based firm Holtzman Vogel Josefiak.

Once all ballots are counted, North Carolina election law allows either candidate to request a recount if the margin is fewer than 10,000 votes.

On November 12, the general counsel of the Durham County Republican Party filed a formal protest with the Durham County Board of Elections alleging "malfeasance" in the tallying of votes in Durham County and calling for a recount. McCrory's campaign said that the 90,000 votes added to the total late on election night appeared to have come from corrupted memory cards. A campaign spokesman said, "What transpired in Durham County is extremely troubling and no citizen can have confidence in the results at this point in time."

On November 14, WRAL reported that there was speculation among political operatives about whether the race could possibly be contested and handed to the North Carolina General Assembly to determine the winner, as was done in 2005, when the General Assembly made June Atkinson the winner of a disputed election for the office of North Carolina Superintendent of Public Instruction. North Carolina House Speaker Tim Moore said getting the General Assembly involved would be "an absolute last resort".

Also on November 14, WRAL reported that the State Bureau of Investigation was investigating whether crimes were committed in the mishandling of 1,000 ballots in the March 2016 primaries in Durham County, the likely epicenter of the battle over the gubernatorial race. The Durham County electoral board chairman said there was no connection between the investigation and the gubernatorial race.

On November 15 Bladen County Soil and Water Conservation District Supervisor McCrae Dowless, a Republican and the incumbent for reelection, filed a protest with that county's board of elections over several hundred absentee ballots cast for Cooper and other Democrats, claiming that they were fraudulent; on the basis of similarity of the handwriting with which they were filled out.  In his initial filing, Dowless claimed corroboration by a handwriting expert.  The complainant had initially expressed concerns about voter fraud related to his own reelection campaign, and before election day.  The McCrory campaign alleged that the ballots were filled out by paid employees of the Bladen County Improvement Association PAC, a political action committee that received funding from the North Carolina Democratic Party. The complaint alleged that one person served as a witness for at least 67 mail-in absentee ballots, and the same person appeared to have filled out the selections on 71 ballots. It said there were at least 250 questionable ballots connected to five people paid by the Bladen County Improvement Association PAC.  That organization has responded that the people involved were volunteers with their get-out-the-vote effort, and that the only payments made to them were small stipends for expenses incurred as part of that activity; such as food and gas costs. The McCrory campaign stated, "A massive voting fraud scheme has been uncovered in Bladen County." In response, the Cooper campaign stated: "Governor McCrory has set a new standard for desperation in his attempts to undermine the results of an election he lost."

On November 16, the McCrory campaign announced it had filed election protests alleging fraud in 11 more counties. On November 17, the McCrory campaign announced the number of counties in which it had filed protests alleging voter fraud had grown to 50 counties, which the Associated Press reported were "without offering detailed proof."

Every county election board in the state has three members: two Republican appointees and one Democrat.

Durham County has been seen as the most pivotal county, as it has the most votes at stake. On November 16, the Durham County Board of Elections voted 2-1 to hold an evidentiary hearing on election protest about the ballots in Durham County. At the hearing on November 18, the board unanimously dismissed the protest, with the board's Republican chairman, William Brian Jr., saying that all the evidence shows that the count is correct.

By November 18, Cooper's unofficial advantage over McCrory had grown to about 6,600 votes, out of almost 4.7 million cast.

On November 20, the state Board of Elections held an emergency meeting. They declined a McCrory campaign petition for the state board to take jurisdiction over all 50 county election protests, except for the one in Bladen County, which they took over. They decided to convene another meeting on November 22 to issue guidance to county boards on how to handle the protests.

On November 22, the McCrory campaign formally requested a statewide recount.

Also on November 22, the Civitas Institute filed a federal lawsuit seeking an injunction to delay the State Board of Elections' count of ballots of unverified same-day registrants, alleging that there is not enough time to verify the eligibility of voters who registered to vote on election day. Civitas said that neither the McCrory campaign nor the state Republican Party were involved in the lawsuit. Civitas cited a 2012 review conducted by the state Board of Elections that found 2.44% of voters who used same-day registration in 2012 failed the verification process, but the process was not completely finished when the ballots were counted. A court hearing is scheduled for December 8.

On November 26, the Durham County Republican Party's general counsel asked the state Board of Elections to hold an expedited hearing on his appeal of the Durham County Board of Elections' refusal to conduct a recount of that county's votes. The campaign stated they would withdraw their request for a statewide recount if a manual recount of Durham County votes produced the same results as were reported on election day.

On November 30, the State Board of Elections ordered a recount of the Durham County votes.  The recount was to be completed by 7 p.m. on December 5. However, by that morning, early results showed no change in the tally. McCrory announced on his campaign's YouTube channel that he was conceding the race to Cooper, saying that it was now clear that "the majority of our citizens had spoken."

Official results

Aftermath
Following the election, the General Assembly, controlled by Republicans, passed legislation that would limit the incoming governor's powers.  Democrats have referred to the move as a power grab, and Republicans have countered that Democrats have made similar moves when they controlled the legislature.

Notes

References

External links
Pat McCrory (R) for Governor
Roy Cooper (D) for Governor
Daniel Orr (L) for Governor

Governor
2016
North Carolina
2016 in North Carolina